Tyndall Branch is a  long 3rd order tributary to Deep Creek, in Sussex County, Delaware.

Variant names
According to the Geographic Names Information System, it has also been known historically as:  
Stoney Branch

Course
Tyndall Branch is formed at the confluence of Stoney Branch and Asketum Branch about 0.5 miles north of Hardscrabble in Sussex County, Delaware.  Tyndall Branch then flows south-southwest to meet Deep Creek about 0.5 miles south-southwest of Old Furnace.

Watershed
Tyndall Branch drains  of area, receives about 45.1 in/year of precipitation, has a topographic wetness index of 690.47 and is about 14.38% forested.

See also
List of rivers of Delaware

References

Rivers of Delaware
Tributaries of the Nanticoke River